Astbury was one of the eight ancient parishes of the Macclesfield Hundred of Cheshire, England.
It included two chapelries and ten townships. The chapelry of Congleton was an ancient borough and became a municipal borough in 1835. Under the Poor Law Amendment Act 1886 the townships and chapelries became civil parishes in their own right. Nine of the townships became part of Congleton Rural District in 1894. whereas Eaton became part of Macclesfield Rural District. At the same time, the Chapelry of Buglawton was made an Urban Sanitary District before being abolished in 1936.

St. Mary's at Astbury is a large 12th-century church, rebuilt on a unique trapezoidal plan in the 13th and 14th centuries. There is a 14th-century effigy of a knight in the Lady Chapel, and another, possibly earlier, canopied tomb in the churchyard. A fragment of a Saxon cross is built into the exterior wall. Ada, fourth daughter of David, 9th Earl of Huntingdon (c1144-1219), is buried here. 

Chapelries:
Buglawton
Congleton
Townships:
Davenport
Eaton
Hulme Walfield
Moreton cum Alcumlow
Newbold Astbury
Odd Rode
Radnor
Smallwood
Somerford
Somerford Booths

References

External links

Villages in Cheshire